Sythe may refer to:

 Osyth (d. 700 AD), an English saint
 an incorrect spelling of scythe, an agricultural hand tool